The 2021–22 Austrian Football Second League  known as the Admiral 2nd League for sponsorship purposes, was the 48th season of the Austrian second-level football league and the fourth as the Second League. The league consisted of 16 teams.

Teams
Sixteen teams participated in the 2021–22 season. The only added team was St. Pölten, relegated from the 2020–21 Austrian Football Bundesliga.

Due to the suspension of the 2020–21 Austrian Regionalliga, no club was relegated from the previous season

SC Austria Lustenau captured the title and will return to the Austrian Football Bundesliga for the first time since the 1999-2000 season.

League table

Results

Season statistics

Top goalscorers

See also
 2021–22 Austrian Football Bundesliga
 2021–22 Austrian Cup

References

External links
 Official website 
 Page on AustriaSoccer.at 

2. Liga (Austria) seasons
2021–22 in Austrian football
Aus